Heterixalus rutenbergi is a species of frogs in the family Hyperoliidae endemic to Madagascar.
Its natural habitats are subtropical or tropical high-altitude grassland, swamps, freshwater marshes, intermittent freshwater marshes, and arable land.
It is threatened by habitat loss.

Description
Heterixalus rutenbergi averages  in length.
The dorsal surface of this frog is light green. It has five white bands bordered by dark brown stripes that run longitudinally along its back. On the sides of the limbs are two similar bands, and one along the feet. The ventral surface is cream-colored, and the undersides of limbs are orange.

References

Heterixalus
Amphibians described in 1881
Endemic frogs of Madagascar
Taxonomy articles created by Polbot